Kenneth Barclift better known by his stage name Fresh or Sur Fresh A lot is an American rapper, songwriter, model and actor. He is best known for being part of the Retro Kids, who became famous for their retro 80's look and style.

Career

Retro Kids
While with the Retro Kids, Fresh has done commercials for MTV, posed for Complex Magazine and caught the eye of entertainment and fashion's elite. In an article for the New York Times Barclift expressed an interest in collaborating with film director Spike Lee to do an 80's movie. One of the co-founders of both Mecca and Enyce clothing lines, Tony Shellman, said of the Retro Kids "They're so energetic and creative". Shellman also had the group pose for his clothing line Parish which has a retro hip-hop style to it. Pop Robinson, creative director of Pro-Keds gave the Retro Kids high praise by saying "They validate a brand like Pro-Keds because we're from the old school". The group said people often stop and take pictures of them. Fresh believes the majority of people in SoHo are "being themselves", and thus prefers to hang there most.

Solo artist
After leaving the Retro Kids, Fresh became a solo artist, performing regularly. He performed at the Page 31 Magazine Launch Party in September 2011. He is often seen in celebrity circles, from parties thrown by rapper Young Jeezy to the birthday celebration of NFL linebacker Dwight Freeney to rapper LL Cool J's album release party. Fresh has also stated that he would like to do a reality show.

References

Living people
Year of birth missing (living people)
American male rappers
Male models
21st-century American male actors